The Indianapolis mayoral election of 1999 took place on November 2, 1999. Voters elected the Mayor of Indianapolis, members of the Indianapolis City-County Council, as well as several other local officials. Democrat Bart Peterson was the first Democrat to be elected as Mayor of Indianapolis since 1963.

Primaries
Primaries were held on May 4.

Democratic primary

Republican primary

Election results

References

1999
1999 United States mayoral elections
1999 Indiana elections